The 2022 World Cadets Wrestling Championships (U17) will be World Cadets Wrestling Championships of combined events, and took place from July 25 to 31 in Rome, Italy.

Competition schedule
All times are (UTC+2)

Medal table

Team ranking

Medal overview

Men's freestyle

Men's Greco-Roman

Women's freestyle

Participating nations 
570 wrestlers from 51 countries:

  (16)
  (1)
  (7)
  (26)
  (2)
  (22)
  (4)
  (7)
  (4)
  (15)
  (2)
  (5)
  (5)
  (9)
  (19)
  (10)
  (12)
  (16)
  (30)
  (20)
  (3)
  (27) (Host)
  (29)
  (27)
  (21)
  (2)
  (2)
  (8)
  (2)
  (12)
  (1)
  (1)
  (2)
  (1)
  (4)
  (2)
  (16)
  (15)
  (9)
  (4)
  (7)
  (2)
  (5)
  (1)
  (1)
  (6)
  (15)
  (30)
  (30)
  (30)
  (19)

References

External links 
 Database

World Cadet Championships
World Cadet Championships
International wrestling competitions hosted by Italy
Sport in Rome
Wrestling in Italy
World Cadet Wrestling Championships
World Wrestling Championships